WRAF (90.9 FM) is a Christian radio station owned and operated by Radio Training Network, Inc. It is licensed to Toccoa Falls, Georgia and serves the Athens metropolitan area along with much of Northeast Georgia. It features a Contemporary Christian music format. Three family ministries are also included in the weekday schedule: Dr. James Dobson, Dr. David Jeremiah and Dr. Charles Stanley .It features news from Salem Communications.

History
Its sister and companion station was WTXR.

The station, along with WEPC (now WAHP), WPFJ, WTXR, and translators W221AZ and W265AZ, was purchased from Toccoa Falls College effective July 25, 2016 for $2.1 million.

Translators and simulcasts
The station relays its signal through various other radio stations and translators to broaden its coverage range:

References

External links

Moody Radio affiliate stations
Radio stations established in 1975
RAF (FM)